Strathaven Academy is a non-denominational secondary school in Strathaven, South Lanarkshire, Scotland.

History
In 1902, Avondale School Board decided to merge two local primary schools; Crosshill and Ballgreen and create a new "Academy". The merge went ahead and the new Academy building was opened in January 1905 by Thomas McKay, Chairman of the school board.

The building was a red sandstone building with ornamental features such as vases on the roof, cupolas, school logo carved in the wall and a central hall.  The hall had a solid oak roof, similar to a hammerbeam, a balcony running all the way around the perimeter, allowing access to the classrooms on the upper floor, staircases on either side of the hall. This building was demolished in 2007.

Admissions
It has a roll of approximately 950 children. There are approximately 80 members of teaching staff and 20 in facilities management, administration and janitorial.

School facilities
The new school building opened in August 2009 replacing the previous one which had become seriously dilapidated and out of date. The new building provides up to date facilities for all departments, including state of the art PE facilities and an all weather sports pitch.

Alumni
 Stuart Braithwaite, musician
 Harry Cochrane, footballer

Grammar school
 Andy Stewart, Conservative MP from 1983-92 for Sherwood, and Chairman from 1992-98 of the Agricultural Training Board

References

External links
 Strathaven Academy Website
 South Lanarkshire Council

Secondary schools in South Lanarkshire
1905 establishments in Scotland
Educational institutions established in 1905
Strathaven